The rivière Sainte-Anne is a watercourse flowing into Gulf of St. Lawrence, flowing in the municipality of L'Île-d'Anticosti, in the Minganie Regional County Municipality, in the administrative region of Côte-Nord, in province of Quebec, in Canada.

A single forest road serves the intermediate part of this valley. This carriage road connects to the west to a forest road network for forestry purposes, as well as to the main road passing on the northern slope of the island. Forestry is the main economic activity in this area; recreational tourism activities, second.

Geography 
The Sainte-Anne river draws its source from the southern part of a marsh area located in the center-west of Anticosti Island. This source is located at:
  east of the town center of the village of Port-Menier;
  south of the north shore of Anticosti Island;
  northeast of the south shore of Anticosti Island.

From its source, the Sainte-Anne river flows south between the rivière aux Cailloux (located on the west side) and the rivière à la Loutre (located on the east side).

  to the south collecting a stream (coming from the northeast), collecting the discharge (coming from the west) of Lake Marmen; then to the south, passing under the forest road bridge and collecting the discharge (coming from the northeast) of a lake, to the western limit of SÉPAQ Anticosti;
  first to the south in the SÉPAQ Anticosti, gradually bending towards the southwest, until a bend in the river located about one hundred meters from the north shore of the Gulf of Saint Laurent; then on  towards the west parallel to the shore of the gulf, to its mouth.

Toponymy 
According to Wikipedia, "Saint Anne" designates in Christianity several saints, blessed and venerable.

The toponymic designation "Rivière Sainte-Anne" appears in a 1904 volume, as well as in the Bulletin de la Société de géographie de Québec in 1924. This name also appears on a 1955 map of the forestry company Consolidated Bathurst.

The toponym “rivière Sainte-Anne” was made official on December 5, 1968, at the Place Names Bank of the Commission de toponymie du Québec.

See also 

 List of rivers of Quebec

References 

Rivers of Côte-Nord
Minganie Regional County Municipality
Anticosti Island